Saida, also spelled Sayda, is a village in southern Syria, administratively part of the Daraa Governorate, located east of Daraa. Nearby localities include al-Naimah to the west, Al-Ghariyah al-Gharbiyah to the north, Kahil and al-Musayfirah to the east and al-Taybah and Umm al-Mayazen to the south. According to the Syria Central Bureau of Statistics (CBS), Saida had a population of 11,215 in the 2004 census.

History
In  the Ottoman  tax registers of 1596, Sayda was a village located the nahiya of  Butayna,  Qada of Hauran. It had a population of 41 households and 13  bachelors, all Muslims. They paid a fixed tax-rate of 40% on agricultural products, including wheat, barley, summer crops, goats and beehives, in addition to occasional revenues; a total of 8,188 akçe. 1/6 of the revenue went to a waqf.

Saida was also noted as a khirba (ruined village) by 1858 during Ottoman rule. However, the second half of that century saw a resurgence in grain cultivation and security in the Hauran region, of which Saida was part. During that period, it was settled and by 1895 had 250 inhabitants.

References

Bibliography

External links
Deraa-map, 22L

19th-century establishments in Ottoman Syria
Populated places in Daraa District